The Railways (Conveyance of Mails) Act 1838 (1 & 2 Vict. c. 98) was an Act of the Parliament of the United Kingdom, which received royal assent on 14 August 1838. It required the transport of the Royal Mail by railways at a standardised fee.

The Act empowered the Postmaster-General to require the railway companies to "convey the mails", either by special trains or scheduled ones, at such times of the day and night as he would direct; he also had power to specify the guards or postal officials to be carried. However, he could not require they be conveyed any faster than the maximum rate prescribed by that railway's directors for first-class trains. The companies were to be subject to Post Office directions regarding the specifics of carriage. If required, a whole carriage was to be set aside exclusively for the post, or a separate carriage for sorting letters. The Postmaster-General could also require the mails be carried in Royal Mail coaches, not the company's carriages.

The Act did not specify a rate of payment, but rather left the remuneration to be agreed between the railways and the Postmaster-General, or if necessary settled by arbitration. These agreements were subject to alteration at a month's notice, though the Postmaster-General had the power to terminate the services of the railway companies without notice if compensation was paid. The penalty for refusing or neglecting to convey the mails was £20, and the railways could be required to post security by bond, under a penalty of £100 per day for neglect. Individual lessees of a railway, those not a body corporate or company, were not to be required to give security above £1,000. Finally, two arbitrators were to be appointed to mediate disputes between the Postmaster-General and the railway companies.

See also
 Travelling post office

References
The British almanac of the Society for the Diffusion of Useful Knowledge, for the year 1839. The Society for the Diffusion of Useful Knowledge, London, 1839.

1838 in British law
United Kingdom Acts of Parliament 1838
Railway Acts